Maria José Alves (born 10 March 1977) is a paralympic athlete from Brazil competing mainly in category T12 sprinting events.

Maria Jose has competed in four paralympics, winning four medals all of which were bronze.  Her first games were in 1996 where she competed in the 100m, 200m, 400m and long jump winning bronze in both the shorter events.  The 2000 Summer Paralympics saw her compete in just the 100m and 200m but without any medal success.  In both 2004 and 2008 she competed in the 100m, 200m and 400m and it was in the 2004 games that she won her last two bronze medals in the 100m and 200m again.

References

External links
 

1977 births
Living people
Brazilian female sprinters
Paralympic athletes of Brazil
Paralympic bronze medalists for Brazil
Paralympic medalists in athletics (track and field)
Athletes (track and field) at the 1996 Summer Paralympics
Athletes (track and field) at the 2004 Summer Paralympics
Medalists at the 1996 Summer Paralympics
Medalists at the 2004 Summer Paralympics
Medalists at the 2007 Parapan American Games
Sportspeople from Ceará
20th-century Brazilian women
21st-century Brazilian women
Visually impaired sprinters
Paralympic sprinters